Periyakulam block is a revenue block in the Theni district of Tamil Nadu, India. It has a total of 17 panchayat villages.

References 
 

Revenue blocks of Theni district